Ghaflah (غفلة) is the Arabic word for negligence and heedlessness. In an Islamic context, it is the sin of forgetting Allah and one's divine origins, or being indifferent of these. It is also the sin of purposeful misguiding, misleading or the deceiving of another, usually through falsity or by failure of full disclosure, through concealment, which keeps another in ignorance and heedlessness.

External links 
Ghaflah: The Sickness of Modern Man

Sufism
Islamic terminology
Arabic words and phrases